När & fjärran is a travel show which was broadcast on TV4 and later on TV4 Plus. During its first seasons it was named Reslust.

References

External links 
 
 

TV4 (Sweden) original programming